The Royal Academy of Turku or the Royal Academy of Åbo ( or ;) was the first university in Finland, and the only Finnish university that was founded when the country still was a part of Sweden. It was founded in 1640. In 1809, after Finland became a Grand Duchy under the suzerainty of the Russian czar, it was renamed the Imperial Academy of Turku. In 1828, after the Great Fire of Turku, the institution was moved to Helsinki, in line with the relocation of the Grand Duchy's capital. It was finally renamed the University of Helsinki when Finland became a sovereign nation-state in 1917.

History

The academy was founded on 26 March 1640 by Queen Christina of Sweden at the proposal of Count Per Brahe, on base of Åbo Cathedral School (founded 1276). It was the third university in the Swedish Empire, following Uppsala University (founded 1477) and the Academia Gustaviana (now the University of Tartu in Estonia) (1632).

The first printing shop in Finland was established at the academy in 1642. The printer was Peder Walde.

Turku (or Åbo in Swedish) was the largest city in Finland and among the three largest in Sweden, while under Swedish sovereignty. In 1809, Finland was ceded to Russia and the capital of the new Grand Duchy of Finland was relocated to Helsinki in 1812, as Turku was regarded as being too remote from Saint Petersburg — and too near to Stockholm. As a result of the Great Fire of Turku of 1827, which devastated most of the city, the government offices that had remained were finally moved to the new capital, and so also was the university. It continued in Helsinki, first as the Imperial Alexander University in Finland, and, following Finland's independence in 1917, as the University of Helsinki.

There are two universities in Turku today: the Swedish-speaking Åbo Akademi University (founded in 1918) and the Finnish-speaking University of Turku (1920), which both sometimes may claim an academic tradition at the location since the 17th century, in spite of a break for almost a century.

See also 
 List of early modern universities in Europe
List of universities in Finland (present-day universities)

Further reading

 Välimaa J. (2019) "The Founding of the Royal Academy of Turku." in A History of Finnish Higher Education from the Middle Ages to the 21st Century. Springer.
 Välimaa J. (2019) "The Academy of Turku During the Last Century of Swedish Rule (1720–1809)." in A History of Finnish Higher Education from the Middle Ages to the 21st Century. Springer.

References

External links
The University of Helsinki official history (in English) - retrieved 9 March 2014.
Pirkko Forsman Svensson: From monolingual to bi- and multilingual instruction at the University of Helsinki

17th-century establishments in Finland
University of Helsinki
19th century in Helsinki
1640 establishments in Sweden
Deposit libraries
19th century in Turku